Main page: List of Canadian plants by family

Families:
A | B | C | D | E | F | G | H | I J K | L | M | N | O | P Q | R | S | T | U V W | X Y Z

Paeoniaceae 

 Paeonia brownii — western peony

Pallaviciniaceae 

 Moerckia blyttii
 Moerckia hibernica
 Pallavicinia lyellii — pallavicinia

Papaveraceae 

 Meconella oregana — white meconella
 Papaver alboroseum — pale poppy
 Papaver alpinum — dwarf poppy
 Papaver dahlianum — polar poppy
 Papaver gorodkovii — Russian poppy
 Papaver lapponicum — Lapland poppy
 Papaver macounii — Macoun's poppy
 Papaver mcconnellii — McConnell's poppy
 Papaver nudicaule — Icelandic poppy
 Papaver pygmaeum — alpine glacier poppy
 Papaver radicatum — Arctic poppy
 Papaver walpolei — Walpole's poppy
 Sanguinaria canadensis — bloodroot
 Stylophorum diphyllum — celandine poppy

Pelliaceae 

 Pellia endiviifolia
 Pellia epiphylla — common pellia
 Pellia neesiana

Phytolaccaceae 

 Phytolacca americana — common pokeweed

Pinaceae 

 Abies amabilis — Pacific silver fir
 Abies balsamea — balsam fir
 Abies grandis — grand fir
 Abies lasiocarpa — subalpine fir
 Abies x phanerolepis
 Larix laricina — tamarack
 Larix lyallii — subalpine larch
 Larix occidentalis — western larch
 Picea engelmannii — Engelmann's spruce
 Picea glauca — white spruce
 Picea mariana — black spruce
 Picea rubens — red spruce
 Picea sitchensis — Sitka spruce
 Picea x lutzii
 Pinus albicaulis — whitebark pine
 Pinus banksiana — jack pine
 Pinus contorta — lodgepole pine
 Pinus flexilis — limber pine
 Pinus monticola — western white pine
 Pinus ponderosa — ponderosa pine
 Pinus resinosa — red pine
 Pinus rigida — pitch pine
 Pinus strobus — eastern white pine
 Pinus x murraybanksiana
 Pseudotsuga menziesii — Douglas-fir
 Tsuga canadensis — eastern hemlock
 Tsuga heterophylla — western hemlock
 Tsuga mertensiana — mountain hemlock

Plagiochilaceae 

 Pedinophyllum interruptum
 Plagiochila arctica
 Plagiochila asplenioides
 Plagiochila austinii
 Plagiochila porelloides
 Plagiochila satoi
 Plagiochila schoefieldiana
 Plagiochila semidecurrens

Plagiotheciaceae 

 Plagiothecium berggrenianum
 Plagiothecium cavifolium
 Plagiothecium denticulatum
 Plagiothecium laetum
 Plagiothecium latebricola — lurking leskea
 Plagiothecium piliferum
 Plagiothecium undulatum

Plantaginaceae 

 Littorella uniflora — American shoregrass
 Plantago bigelovii — Bigelow's plantain
 Plantago canescens — hairy plantain
 Plantago cordata — heartleaf plantain
 Plantago elongata — slender plantain
 Plantago eriopoda — saline plantain
 Plantago macrocarpa — Alaska plantain
 Plantago maritima — seaside plantain
 Plantago patagonica — woolly plantain
 Plantago rugelii — blackseed plantain
 Plantago tweedyi — Tweedy's plantain

Pleuroziaceae 

 Pleurozia purpurea

Pleuroziopsidaceae 

 Pleuroziopsis ruthenica

Plumbaginaceae 

 Armeria maritima — western thrift
 Limonium carolinianum — sea-lavender

Poaceae 

 Achnatherum hymenoides — Indian mountain-ricegrass
 Achnatherum lemmonii — Lemmon's needlegrass
 Achnatherum nelsonii — Nelson's needlegrass
 Achnatherum occidentale — western needlegrass
 Achnatherum richardsonii — Canada mountain-ricegrass
 Agrostis aequivalvis — northern bentgrass
 Agrostis alascana — Alaska bentgrass
 Agrostis clavata — clubbed bentgrass
 Agrostis diegoensis — leafy bentgrass
 Agrostis exarata — spike bentgrass
 Agrostis geminata — hairgrass
 Agrostis humilis — mountain bentgrass
 Agrostis hyemalis — winter bentgrass
 Agrostis idahoensis — Idaho bentgrass
 Agrostis mertensii — Arctic bentgrass
 Agrostis microphylla — small-leaf bentgrass
 Agrostis oregonensis — Oregon bentgrass
 Agrostis pallens — seashore bentgrass
 Agrostis perennans — perennial bentgrass
 Agrostis scabra — rough bentgrass
 Agrostis stolonifera — creeping bentgrass
 Agrostis thurberiana — Thurber's bentgrass
 Agrostis variabilis — variable bentgrass
 Alopecurus aequalis — shortawn foxtail
 Alopecurus alpinus — mountain foxtail
 Alopecurus carolinianus — tufted foxtail
 Ammophila breviligulata — American beachgrass
 Andropogon gerardi — big bluestem
 Andropogon hallii — sand bluestem
 Andropogon virginicus — common broom-sedge
 Arctagrostis latifolia — broadleaf arctagrostis
 Arctophila fulva — pendant-grass
 Aristida basiramea — forked three-awn grass
 Aristida dichotoma — Shinner's three-awn grass
 Aristida longespica — slimspike three-awn grass
 Aristida purpurascens — purple needlegrass
 Aristida purpurea — purple three-awn grass
 Beckmannia syzigachne — American sloughgrass
 Bouteloua curtipendula — side-oats gramma
 Bouteloua gracilis — blue gramma
 Bouteloua hirsuta — hairy gramma
 Brachyelytrum erectum — bearded shorthusk
 Brachyelytrum septentrionale — northern shorthusk
 Bromus anomalus — nodding brome
 Bromus carinatus — California brome
 Bromus ciliatus — fringed brome
 Bromus inermis — awnless brome
 Bromus kalmii — wild chess
 Bromus latiglumis — broad-glumed brome
 Bromus nottowayanus — Nottoway brome
 Bromus pacificus — Pacific brome
 Bromus porteri — Porter's chess
 Bromus pubescens — hairy wood brome
 Bromus sitchensis — Alaska brome
 Bromus vulgaris — narrow-flowered brome
 Buchloe dactyloides — buffalo grass
 Calamagrostis canadensis — bluejoint reedgrass
 Calamagrostis coarctata — Nuttall's reedgrass
 Calamagrostis deschampsioides — circumpolar small-reedgrass
 Calamagrostis holmii — Holm's small-reedgrass
 Calamagrostis lapponica — Lapland reedgrass
 Calamagrostis montanensis — plains reedgrass
 Calamagrostis nutkaensis — Pacific small-reedgrass
 Calamagrostis pickeringii — Pickering's reed bentgrass
 Calamagrostis purpurascens — purple reedgrass
 Calamagrostis rubescens — pine reedgrass
 Calamagrostis sesquiflora — one-and-a-half-flower small-reedgrass
 Calamagrostis stricta — slimstem small-reedgrass
 Calamovilfa longifolia — sand reedgrass
 Catabrosa aquatica — brook grass
 Cenchrus longispinus — longspine sandbur
 Chasmanthium latifolium — Indian sea-oats
 Cinna arundinacea — stout wood reedgrass
 Cinna latifolia — slender wood reedgrass
 Coleanthus subtilis — moss grass
 Danthonia californica — California oatgrass
 Danthonia compressa — flattened oatgrass
 Danthonia intermedia — Vasey's oatgrass
 Danthonia parryi — Parry's oatgrass
 Danthonia spicata — poverty oatgrass
 Danthonia unispicata — few-flowered oatgrass
 Deschampsia alpina — alpine hairgrass
 Deschampsia beringensis — Bering hairgrass
 Deschampsia brevifolia — shortleaf hairgrass
 Deschampsia caespitosa — tufted hairgrass
 Deschampsia danthonioides — annual hairgrass
 Deschampsia elongata — slender hairgrass
 Deschampsia flexuosa — wavy hairgrass
 Deschampsia holciformis — Pacific hairgrass
 Deschampsia mackenzieana — MacKenzie's hairgrass
 Diarrhena americana — American beakgrain
 Diarrhena obovata — beak grass
 Dichanthelium acuminatum — tapered rosette grass
 Dichanthelium boreale — northern witchgrass
 Dichanthelium boscii — Bosc's witchgrass
 Dichanthelium clandestinum — deer-tongue witchgrass
 Dichanthelium depauperatum — starved witchgrass
 Dichanthelium dichotomum — cypress witchgrass
 Dichanthelium latifolium — broadleaf witchgrass
 Dichanthelium leibergii — Leiberg's rosette grass
 Dichanthelium leucothrix — roughish witchgrass
 Dichanthelium linearifolium — slimleaf witchgrass
 Dichanthelium longiligulatum — coastal plain witchgrass
 Dichanthelium meridionale — matting witchgrass
 Dichanthelium oligosanthes — Heller's witchgrass
 Dichanthelium ovale — egg-leaf witchgrass
 Dichanthelium sabulorum — hemlock witchgrass
 Dichanthelium scabriusculum — woolly witchgrass
 Dichanthelium sphaerocarpon — roundfruit panicgrass
 Dichanthelium spretum — Eaton's witchgrass
 Dichanthelium villosissimum — whitehair witchgrass
 Dichanthelium wilcoxianum — Wilcox' panicgrass
 Dichanthelium xanthophysum — slender dichanthelium
 Digitaria cognata — mountain hairgrass
 Distichlis spicata — seashore saltgrass
 Dupontia fisheri — Fisher's dupontia
 Echinochloa muricata — rough barnyard grass
 Echinochloa walteri — Walter's barnyard grass
 Elymus alaskanus — Alaska wild rye
 Elymus albicans — Montana wild rye
 Elymus calderi — Calder's wild rye
 Elymus canadensis — nodding wild rye
 Elymus diversiglumis — interrupted wild rye
 Elymus elymoides — bottlebrush squirrel-tail
 Elymus glaucus — smooth wild rye
 Elymus hirsutus — boreal wild rye
 Elymus hystrix — bottlebrush grass
 Elymus lanceolatus — streamside wild rye
 Elymus macrourus — thickspike wild rye
 Elymus riparius — river wild rye
 Elymus scribneri — Scribner's wild rye
 Elymus sibiricus — Siberian wild rye
 Elymus submuticus — wild rye
 Elymus trachycaulus — slender wild rye
 Elymus villosus — hairy wild rye
 Elymus virginicus — Virginia wild rye
 Elymus vulpinus — Rydberg's wild rye
 Elymus wiegandii — Wiegand's wild rye
 Elymus x dorei — Dore's wild rye
 Elymus x ebingeri — Ebinger's wild rye
 Elymus x hansenii — Hansen's wild rye
 Elymus x maltei — Malte's wild rye
 Elymus x mossii — Moss' wild rye
 Elymus x palmerensis — Palmer's wild rye
 Elymus x pseudorepens — quackgrass
 Eragrostis capillaris — tiny lovegrass
 Eragrostis frankii — Frank's lovegrass
 Eragrostis hypnoides — teal lovegrass
 Eragrostis pectinacea — purple lovegrass
 Eragrostis spectabilis — purple lovegrass
 Festuca altaica — rough fescue
 Festuca baffinensis — Baffin fescue
 Festuca brachyphylla — shortleaf fescue
 Festuca brevissima — Alaska fescue
 Festuca campestris — blue rough fescue
 Festuca edlundiae — Arctic festuca
 Festuca frederikseniae — North Atlantic fescue
 Festuca hallii — Hall's rough fescue
 Festuca heteromalla — spreading fescue
 Festuca hyperborea — boreal fescue
 Festuca idahoensis — Idaho fescue
 Festuca lenensis — tundra fescue
 Festuca minutiflora — smallflower fescue
 Festuca occidentalis — western fescue
 Festuca richardsonii — Richardson's fescue
 Festuca rubra — red fescue
 Festuca saximontana — Rocky Mountain fescue
 Festuca subulata — nodding fescue
 Festuca subuliflora — crinkle-awn fescue
 Festuca subverticillata — nodding fescue
 Festuca viridula — mountain fescue
 Festuca viviparoidea — northern fescue
 Glyceria borealis — small floating mannagrass
 Glyceria canadensis — Canada mannagrass
 Glyceria elata — tall mannagrass
 Glyceria grandis — American mannagrass
 Glyceria laxa — northern mannagrass
 Glyceria leptostachya — slimhead mannagrass
 Glyceria melicaria — slender mannagrass
 Glyceria obtusa — blunt mannagrass
 Glyceria occidentalis — northwestern mannagrass
 Glyceria pulchella — MacKenzie Valley mannagrass
 Glyceria septentrionalis — floating mannagrass
 Glyceria striata — fowl mannagrass
 Glyceria x gatineauensis — Gatineau mannagrass
 Helictotrichon hookeri — spike-oat
 Hesperostipa comata — needle-and-thread
 Hesperostipa curtiseta — western porcupine grass
 Hesperostipa spartea — porcupine needlegrass
 Hierochloe alpina — alpine sweet grass
 Hierochloe hirta — northern sweet grass
 Hierochloe odorata — vanilla grass
 Hierochloe pauciflora — Arctic sweet grass
 Hordeum brachyantherum — meadow barley
 Hordeum jubatum — foxtail barley
 Hordeum pusillum — little barley
 Koeleria asiatica — Oriental junegrass
 Koeleria macrantha — prairie junegrass
 Leersia oryzoides — rice cutgrass
 Leersia virginica — Virginia cutgrass
 Leymus cinereus — Great Basin lyme grass
 Leymus innovatus — northwestern wildrye
 Leymus mollis — sea lyme grass
 Leymus triticoides — beardless lyme grass
 Leymus x vancouverensis — Vancouver Island lyme grass
 Melica bulbosa — western melicgrass
 Melica fugax — small melicgrass
 Melica harfordii — Harford's melicgrass
 Melica hitchcockii — Alberta melicgrass
 Melica smithii — Smith's melicgrass
 Melica spectabilis — showy melicgrass
 Melica subulata — Alaska onion grass
 Milium effusum — tall millet grass
 Monroa squarrosa — munro grass
 Muhlenbergia andina — foxtail muhly
 Muhlenbergia asperifolia — alkali muhly
 Muhlenbergia cuspidata — plains mühlenbergia
 Muhlenbergia filiformis — Pullup muhly
 Muhlenbergia frondosa — wirestem muhly
 Muhlenbergia glomerata — marsh muhly
 Muhlenbergia mexicana — Mexican muhly
 Muhlenbergia racemosa — green muhly
 Muhlenbergia richardsonis — softleaf muhly
 Muhlenbergia schreberi — Schreiber's muhly
 Muhlenbergia sobolifera — cliff muhly
 Muhlenbergia sylvatica — woodland muhly
 Muhlenbergia tenuiflora — slender muhly
 Muhlenbergia uniflora — fall dropseed muhly
 Nassella viridula — green needlegrass
 Oryzopsis asperifolia — white-grained mountain-ricegrass
 Panicum capillare — old witch panicgrass
 Panicum dichotomiflorum — spreading panicgrass
 Panicum flexile — wiry witch grass
 Panicum gattingeri — Gattinger's panicgrass
 Panicum philadelphicum — Philadelphia panicgrass
 Panicum rigidulum — redtop panicgrass
 Panicum virgatum — old switch panicgrass
 Pascopyrum smithii — western wheatgrass
 Paspalum setaceum — slender paspalum
 Phalaris arundinacea — reed canarygrass
 Phippsia algida — ice grass
 Phippsia concinna — snow grass
 Phleum alpinum — mountain timothy
 Phragmites australis — common reed
 Piptatherum canadense — Canada mountain ricegrass
 Piptatherum exiguum — little ricegrass
 Piptatherum micranthum — little mountain-ricegrass
 Piptatherum pungens — slender mountain-ricegrass
 Piptatherum racemosum — blackfruit mountain-ricegrass
 Piptochaetium avenaceum — blackseed needlegrass
 Pleuropogon refractus — nodding false semaphore grass
 Pleuropogon sabinei — sabine-grass
 Poa abbreviata — northern bluegrass
 Poa alpina — alpine bluegrass
 Poa alsodes — grove meadow grass
 Poa arctica — Arctic bluegrass
 Poa arida — prairie bluegrass
 Poa confinis — dune bluegrass
 Poa cusickii — Cusick's bluegrass
 Poa eminens — largeflower bluegrass
 Poa fendleriana — muttongrass
 Poa flexuosa — flexible bluegrass
 Poa gaspensis — Gaspé Peninsula bluegrass
 Poa glauca — white bluegrass
 Poa hartzii — Hartz' bluegrass
 Poa howellii — Howell's bluegrass
 Poa interior — inland bluegrass
 Poa laxa — Mt. Washington bluegrass
 Poa laxiflora — loose-flowered bluegrass
 Poa leibergii — Leiberg's bluegrass
 Poa leptocoma — bog bluegrass
 Poa lettermanii — Letterman's bluegrass
 Poa macrantha — sand-dune bluegrass
 Poa marcida — weak bluegrass
 Poa nemoralis — woods bluegrass
 Poa nervosa — Hooker's bluegrass
 Poa palustris — fowl bluegrass
 Poa porsildii — Porsild's bluegrass
 Poa pratensis — Kentucky bluegrass
 Poa pseudoabbreviata — polar bluegrass
 Poa reflexa — nodding bluegrass
 Poa saltuensis — drooping bluegrass
 Poa secunda — curly bluegrass
 Poa stenantha — narrowflower bluegrass
 Poa suksdorfii — western bluegrass
 Poa sylvestris — woodland bluegrass
 Poa tolmatchewii — Tolmatchew's bluegrass
 Poa wheeleri  Wheeler's bluegrass
 Poa x limosa — Lassen County bluegrass
 Pseudoroegneria spicata — Bluebunch wheatgrass
 Puccinellia agrostidea — tundra alkali grass
 Puccinellia ambigua — Alberton alkali grass
 Puccinellia americana — American alkali grass
 Puccinellia andersonii — Anderson's alkali grass
 Puccinellia angustata — northern alkali grass
 Puccinellia arctica — Arctic alkali grass
 Puccinellia bruggemannii — Prince Patrick alkali grass
 Puccinellia deschampsioides — polar alkali grass
 Puccinellia distans — spreading alkali grass
 Puccinellia fasciculata — saltmarsh goosegrass
 Puccinellia grandis — Pacific alkali grass
 Puccinellia interior — inland alkali grass
 Puccinellia kurilensis — dwarf alkali grass
 Puccinellia laurentiana — Tracadigash Mountain alkali grass
 Puccinellia lemmonii — Lemmon's alkali grass
 Puccinellia lucida — shining alkali grass
 Puccinellia macra — Bonaventure Island alkali grass
 Puccinellia nutkaensis — Alaska alkali grass
 Puccinellia nuttalliana — Nuttall's alkali grass
 Puccinellia phryganodes — creeping alkali grass
 Puccinellia poacea — floodplain alkali grass
 Puccinellia tenella — tundra alkali grass
 Puccinellia vaginata — Arctic tussock alkali grass
 Puccinellia vahliana — Vahl's alkali grass
 Schedonnardus paniculatus — tumble grass
 Schizachne purpurascens — purple oat
 Schizachyrium scoparium — little bluestem
 Scolochloa festucacea — sprangletop
 Sorghastrum nutans — yellow Indiangrass
 Spartina alterniflora — saltwater cordgrass
 Spartina gracilis — alkali cordgrass
 Spartina patens — saltmeadow cordgrass
 Spartina pectinata — freshwater cordgrass
 Spartina x caespitosa — marsh cordgrass
 Sphenopholis intermedia — slender wedgescale
 Sphenopholis nitida — shiny wedgegrass
 Sphenopholis obtusata — prairie wedgegrass
 Sporobolus airoides — alkali sacaton
 Sporobolus compositus — tall dropseed
 Sporobolus cryptandrus — sand dropseed
 Sporobolus heterolepis — northern dropseed
 Sporobolus neglectus — small dropseed
 Sporobolus vaginiflorus — sheathed dropseed
 Torreyochloa pallida — pale manna grass
 Triplasis purpurea — purple sandgrass
 Trisetum canescens — nodding trisetum
 Trisetum melicoides — purple false oats
 Trisetum montanum — mountain oats
 Trisetum sibiricum — Siberian false oats
 Trisetum spicatum — narrow false oats
 Trisetum wolfii — beardless oats
 Vahlodea atropurpurea — mountain hairgrass
 Vulpia microstachys — small six-weeks grass
 Vulpia octoflora — slender eight-flowered fescue
 Zizania aquatica — eastern wild rice
 Zizania palustris — northern wild rice
 x Agroelymus bowdenii
 x Dupoa labradorica
 x Elyhordeum chatangensis
 x Elyhordeum macounii
 x Elyhordeum montanense
 x Elyhordeum schaackianum
 x Elyleymus colvillensis
 x Elyleymus hirtiflorus
 x Elyleymus jamesensis
 x Elyleymus turneri
 x Elyleymus uclueletensis
 x Elyleymus ungavensis
 x Pucciphippsia vacillans

Podostemaceae 

 Podostemum ceratophyllum — threadfoot

Polemoniaceae 

 Collomia grandiflora — largeflower collomia
 Collomia heterophylla — varied-leaved collomia
 Collomia linearis — narrow-leaved collomia
 Collomia tenella — diffuse collomia
 Gilia sinuata — rosy gilia
 Gilia tenerrima — delicate gilia
 Ipomopsis aggregata — scarlet skyrocket
 Ipomopsis minutiflora — smallflower standing-cypress
 Leptodactylon pungens — granite prickly-phlox
 Linanthus bicolor — bicoloured desert-gold
 Linanthus harknessii — harkness linanthus
 Linanthus septentrionalis — northern desert-gold
 Navarretia divaricata — mountain navarretia
 Navarretia intertexta — needleleaf navarretia
 Navarretia leucocephala — whiteflower navarretia
 Navarretia squarrosa — skunkweed
 Phlox alyssifolia — alyssum-leaf phlox
 Phlox caespitosa — carpet phlox
 Phlox diffusa — spreading phlox
 Phlox divaricata — wild blue phlox
 Phlox gracilis — slender phlox
 Phlox hoodii — Hood's phlox
 Phlox longifolia — longleaf phlox
 Phlox maculata — northern meadow phlox
 Phlox richardsonii — Richardson's phlox
 Phlox sibirica — Siberian phlox
 Phlox speciosa — showy phlox
 Polemonium acutiflorum — tall Jacob's-ladder
 Polemonium boreale — northern Jacob's-ladder
 Polemonium californicum — California polemonium
 Polemonium elegans — elegant polemonium
 Polemonium micranthum — annual polemonium
 Polemonium occidentale — western Jacob's-ladder
 Polemonium pulcherrimum — showy Jacob's-ladder
 Polemonium vanbruntiae — bog Jacob's-ladder
 Polemonium viscosum — skunk polemonium

Polygalaceae 

 Polygala alba — white milkwort
 Polygala incarnata — pink milkwort
 Polygala paucifolia — gaywing milkwort
 Polygala polygama — racemed milkwort
 Polygala sanguinea — field milkwort
 Polygala senega — Seneca snakeroot
 Polygala verticillata — whorled milkwort

Polygonaceae 

 Eriogonum androsaceum — rock-jasmine wild buckwheat
 Eriogonum cernuum — nodding wild buckwheat
 Eriogonum flavum — yellow wild buckwheat
 Eriogonum heracleoides — parsnip-flower wild buckwheat
 Eriogonum niveum — snow wild buckwheat
 Eriogonum ovalifolium — oval-leaf buckwheat
 Eriogonum pauciflorum — smallflower wild buckwheat
 Eriogonum pyrolifolium — pyrola-leaved wild buckwheat
 Eriogonum strictum — blue mountain wild buckwheat
 Eriogonum umbellatum — sulphur-flower wild buckwheat
 Koenigia islandica — island kœnigia
 Oxyria digyna — mountain-sorrel
 Polygonella articulata — eastern jointweed
 Polygonum achoreum — leathery knotweed
 Polygonum alpinum — alpine smartweed
 Polygonum amphibium — water smartweed
 Polygonum arifolium — halberd-leaf tearthumb
 Polygonum bellardii — narrowleaf knotweed
 Polygonum bistorta — meadow bistort
 Polygonum bistortoides — American bistort
 Polygonum boreale — northern knotweed
 Polygonum buxiforme — Small's knotweed
 Polygonum careyi — Carey's smartweed
 Polygonum caurianum — Alaska knotweed
 Polygonum ciliinode — fringed black-bindweed
 Polygonum douglasii — Douglas' knotweed
 Polygonum erectum — erect knotweed
 Polygonum fowleri — Fowler's knotweed
 Polygonum franktonii — Nova Scotia knotweed
 Polygonum hudsonianum — Hudson Bay knotweed
 Polygonum hydropiper — marshpepper smartweed
 Polygonum hydropiperoides — mild water-pepper
 Polygonum lapathifolium — dockleaf smartweed
 Polygonum minimum — leafy dwarf knotweed
 Polygonum oxyspermum — sharpfruit knotweed
 Polygonum paronychia — beach knotweed
 Polygonum pensylvanicum — Pennsylvania smartweed
 Polygonum polygaloides — white-margin knotweed
 Polygonum punctatum — dotted smartweed
 Polygonum raii — Ray's knotweed
 Polygonum ramosissimum — bushy knotweed
 Polygonum robustius — stout smartweed
 Polygonum sagittatum — arrowleaf tearthumb
 Polygonum scandens — climbing false buckwheat
 Polygonum tenue — slender knotweed
 Polygonum virginianum — Virginia knotweed
 Polygonum viviparum — viviparous knotweed
 Rumex acetosa — garden sorrel
 Rumex altissimus — tall dock
 Rumex aquaticus — western dock
 Rumex arcticus — Arctic dock
 Rumex beringensis — Bering Sea dock
 Rumex maritimus — seaside dock
 Rumex occidentalis
 Rumex orbiculatus — water dock
 Rumex pallidus — seabeach dock
 Rumex paucifolius — alpine sheep sorrel
 Rumex salicifolius — willow dock
 Rumex venosus — veined dock
 Rumex verticillatus — swamp dock
 Rumex x alexidis
 Rumex x franktonis — Frankton's dock

Polypodiaceae 

 Polypodium amorphum — irregular polypody
 Polypodium appalachianum — Appalachian rockcap fern
 Polypodium glycyrrhiza — licorice fern
 Polypodium hesperium — western polypody
 Polypodium scouleri — coast polypody
 Polypodium sibiricum — Siberian polypody
 Polypodium virginianum — rock polypody
 Polypodium x incognitum

Polytrichaceae 

 Atrichum altecristatum
 Atrichum angustatum
 Atrichum crispum
 Atrichum haussknechtii
 Atrichum oerstedianum
 Atrichum selwynii
 Atrichum tenellum
 Atrichum undulatum — wavy catherinea
 Bartramiopsis lescurii
 Oligotrichum aligerum
 Oligotrichum falcatum
 Oligotrichum hercynicum
 Oligotrichum parallelum
 Pogonatum brachyphyllum — haircap
 Pogonatum contortum
 Pogonatum dentatum — haircap
 Pogonatum pensilvanicum
 Pogonatum urnigerum — haircap
 Polytrichastrum alpinum — alpine polytrichastrum moss
 Polytrichum commune — common haircap moss
 Polytrichum formosum
 Polytrichum hyperboreum
 Polytrichum juniperinum — juniper moss
 Polytrichum longisetum — haircap
 Polytrichum lyallii
 Polytrichum ohioense
 Polytrichum pallidisetum
 Polytrichum piliferum — hairmoss
 Polytrichum sexangulare
 Polytrichum sphaerothecium
 Polytrichum strictum — bog haircap moss
 Polytrichum swartzii
 Psilopilum cavifolium
 Psilopilum laevigatum

Pontederiaceae 

 Heteranthera dubia — grassleaf mud-plantain
 Pontederia cordata — pickerelweed

Porellaceae 

 Porella cordaeana
 Porella navicularis
 Porella pinnata
 Porella platyphylla
 Porella platyphylloidea
 Porella roellii

Portulacaceae 

 Calandrinia ciliata — red maids
 Cistanthe tweedyi — Tweedy's bitterroot
 Cistanthe umbellata — Mount Hood pussy-paws
 Claytonia caroliniana — Carolina spring-beauty
 Claytonia cordifolia — heartleaf spring-beauty
 Claytonia exigua — serpentine spring-beauty
 Claytonia lanceolata — lanceleaf spring-beauty
 Claytonia megarhiza — alpine spring-beauty
 Claytonia ogilviensis — Ogilve Mountain spring-beauty
 Claytonia parviflora — littleflower spring-beauty
 Claytonia perfoliata — miner's-lettuce
 Claytonia rubra — redstem spring-beauty
 Claytonia sarmentosa — Alaska spring-beauty
 Claytonia scammaniana — Scamman's spring-beauty
 Claytonia sibirica — Siberian spring-beauty
 Claytonia tuberosa — tuber spring-beauty
 Claytonia virginica — narrowleaf spring-beauty
 Claytonia washingtoniana — Washington spring-beauty
 Lewisia columbiana — Columbian bitterroot
 Lewisia pygmaea — alpine bitterroot
 Lewisia rediviva — Oregon bitterroot
 Lewisia triphylla — three-leaf bitterroot
 Montia bostockii — Bostock's miner's-lettuce
 Montia chamissoi — Chamisso's miner's-lettuce
 Montia dichotoma — dwarf miner's-lettuce
 Montia diffusa — diffuse montia
 Montia fontana — fountain miner's-lettuce
 Montia howellii — Howell's miner's-lettuce
 Montia linearis — linearleaf miner's-lettuce
 Montia parvifolia — littleleaf miner's-lettuce
 Talinum sediforme — Okanogan flameflower

Potamogetonaceae 

 Potamogeton alpinus — northern pondweed
 Potamogeton amplifolius — largeleaf pondweed
 Potamogeton bicupulatus — snail-seed pondweed
 Potamogeton compressus — flatstem pondweed
 Potamogeton confervoides — algæ-like pondweed
 Potamogeton epihydrus — Nuttall's pondweed
 Potamogeton filiformis — slender pondweed
 Potamogeton foliosus — leafy pondweed
 Potamogeton friesii — Fries' pondweed
 Potamogeton gramineus — grassy pondweed
 Potamogeton hillii — Hill's pondweed
 Potamogeton illinoensis — Illinois pondweed
 Potamogeton methyensis — Methy Lake pondweed
 Potamogeton natans — floating pondweed
 Potamogeton nodosus — longleaf pondweed
 Potamogeton oakesianus — Oakes' pondweed
 Potamogeton oblongus — cinnamon-spot pondweed
 Potamogeton obtusifolius — bluntleaf pondweed
 Potamogeton ogdenii — Ogden's pondweed
 Potamogeton pectinatus — Sago pondweed
 Potamogeton perfoliatus — claspingleaf pondweed
 Potamogeton praelongus — whitestem pondweed
 Potamogeton pulcher — spotted pondweed
 Potamogeton pusillus — slender pondweed
 Potamogeton richardsonii — redheadgrass
 Potamogeton robbinsii — flatleaf pondweed
 Potamogeton spirillus — spiral pondweed
 Potamogeton strictifolius — straightleaf pondweed
 Potamogeton subsibiricus — Yenisei River pondweed
 Potamogeton vaginatus — sheathed pondweed
 Potamogeton vaseyi — Vasey's pondweed
 Potamogeton x faxonii — Faxon's pondweed
 Potamogeton x griffithii — Griffith's pondweed
 Potamogeton x hagstroemii — Hagstrøm's pondweed
 Potamogeton x haynesii — Haynes' pondweed
 Potamogeton x nericus
 Potamogeton x nitens
 Potamogeton x saxonicus — Saxon pondweed
 Potamogeton x schreberi — Schreiber's pondweed
 Potamogeton x scoliophyllus
 Potamogeton x sparganiifolius
 Potamogeton x spathuliformis
 Potamogeton x suecicus

Pottiaceae 

 Acaulon muticum
 Acaulon triquetrum
 Aloina bifrons
 Aloina brevirostris
 Aloina rigida
 Anoectangium aestivum
 Anoectangium tenuinerve
 Astomum muehlenbergianum
 Astomum phascoides
 Barbula amplexifolia
 Barbula convoluta
 Barbula coreensis
 Barbula eustegia
 Barbula indica
 Barbula unguiculata
 Bryoerythrophyllum columbianum
 Bryoerythrophyllum ferruginascens
 Bryoerythrophyllum recurvirostre
 Crossidium aberrans
 Crossidium seriatum
 Crumia latifolia
 Desmatodon cernuus
 Desmatodon convolutus
 Desmatodon guepinii
 Desmatodon heimii
 Desmatodon latifolius
 Desmatodon laureri
 Desmatodon leucostoma
 Desmatodon obtusifolius
 Desmatodon porteri
 Desmatodon randii
 Desmatodon systylius
 Didymodon asperifolius
 Didymodon fallax
 Didymodon johansenii
 Didymodon leskeoides
 Didymodon michiganensis
 Didymodon nevadensis
 Didymodon nigrescens
 Didymodon rigidulus
 Didymodon subandreaeoides
 Didymodon tophaceus
 Didymodon vinealis
 Eucladium verticillatum — lime-seep eucladium
 Geheebia gigantea
 Gymnostomum aeruginosum
 Gymnostomum calcareum
 Gyroweisia reflexa
 Gyroweisia tenuis
 Hymenostylium insigne
 Hymenostylium recurvirostre — hymenostylium moss
 Hyophila involuta — hyophila moss
 Molendoa sendtneriana
 Oxystegus spiralis
 Oxystegus tenuirostris
 Paraleptodontium recurvifolium
 Phascum cuspidatum
 Phascum floerkeanum
 Phascum vlassovii
 Pleurochaete squarrosa
 Pottia bryoides
 Pottia davalliana
 Pottia intermedia
 Pottia nevadensis
 Pottia truncata
 Pottia wilsonii
 Pseudocrossidium revolutum
 Pterygoneurum kozlovii
 Pterygoneurum lamellatum
 Pterygoneurum ovatum
 Pterygoneurum subsessile
 Stegonia latifolia
 Stegonia pilifera
 Timmiella crassinervis
 Tortella arctica
 Tortella fragilis
 Tortella humilis
 Tortella inclinata
 Tortella tortelloides
 Tortella tortuosa — twisted moss
 Tortula amplexa
 Tortula bartramii
 Tortula bolanderi
 Tortula brevipes
 Tortula cainii
 Tortula caninervis — tortula moss
 Tortula laevipila
 Tortula latifolia
 Tortula mucronifolia
 Tortula muralis
 Tortula norvegica
 Tortula papillosa
 Tortula papillosissima
 Tortula princeps
 Tortula ruralis — tortula moss
 Tortula scotteri
 Tortula subulata
 Trichostomopsis australasiae
 Trichostomum arcticum
 Trichostomum crispulum
 Weissia controversa
 Weissia hedwigii

Primulaceae 

 Anagallis minima — chaffweed
 Androsace alaskana  (syn. Douglasia alaskana) — Alaska rock-jasmine
 Androsace chamaejasme — sweetflower rock-jasmine
 Androsace filiformis — slender rock-jasmine
 Androsace laevigata (syn. Douglasia laevigata) — cliff douglasia
 Androsace montana (syn. Douglasia montana) — mountain douglasia
 Androsace occidentalis — western rock-jasmine
 Androsace ochotensis (syns. Androsace arctica, Douglasia ochotensis) — Alaska douglasia
 Androsace septentrionalis (syn. Douglasia ochotensis subsp. gormanii ) — pygmyflower rock-jasmine, Gorman's douglasia 
 Dodecatheon conjugens — Bonneville shootingstar
 Dodecatheon dentatum — white shootingstar
 Dodecatheon frigidum — northern shootingstar
 Dodecatheon hendersonii — Henderson's shootingstar
 Dodecatheon jeffreyi — Jeffrey's shootingstar
 Dodecatheon meadia — shootingstar
 Dodecatheon pulchellum — few-flower shootingstar
 Glaux maritima — sea milkwort
 Lysimachia ciliata — fringed loosestrife
 Lysimachia hybrida — lanceleaf loosestrife
 Lysimachia lanceolata — lanceleaf loosestrife
 Lysimachia quadriflora — four-flower loosestrife
 Lysimachia quadrifolia — whorled yellow loosestrife
 Lysimachia terrestris — swamp loosestrife
 Lysimachia thyrsiflora — water loosestrife
 Lysimachia × commixta
 Lysimachia × producta
 Primula borealis — slender primrose
 Primula cuneifolia — wedgeleaf primrose
 Primula egaliksensis — Greenland primrose
 Primula eximia — Arctic primrose
 Primula incana — Jones' primrose
 Primula laurentiana — St. Lawrence primrose
 Primula mistassinica — bird's-eye primrose
 Primula nutans — sleepy primrose
 Primula stricta — stiff primrose
 Samolus valerandi — Valerand's brookweed
 Trientalis borealis — northern starflower
 Trientalis europaea — Arctic starflower

Pseudolepicoleaceae 

 Blepharostoma trichophyllum

Pteridaceae 

 Adiantum aleuticum — Aleutian maidenhair fern
 Adiantum capillus-veneris — southern maidenhair fern
 Adiantum pedatum — northern maidenhair fern
 Adiantum viridimontanum — Green Mountain maidenhair fern
 Aspidotis densa — Indian's-dream
 Cheilanthes feei — Fee's lipfern
 Cheilanthes gracillima — lace lipfern
 Cryptogramma acrostichoides — American rockbrake
 Cryptogramma cascadensis — Cascade rockbrake
 Cryptogramma sitchensis — Sitka rockbrake
 Cryptogramma stelleri — fragile rockbrake
 Pellaea atropurpurea — purplestem rockbrake
 Pellaea gastonyi — Gastony's rockbrake
 Pellaea glabella — smooth rockbrake
 Pentagramma triangularis — western gold fern

Pterigynandraceae 

 Heterocladium dimorphum
 Heterocladium macounii
 Heterocladium procurrens
 Iwatsukiella leucotricha
 Myurella julacea
 Myurella sibirica
 Myurella tenerrima
 Pterigynandrum filiforme

Ptilidiaceae 

 Ptilidium ciliare — northern naugehyde liverwort
 Ptilidium pulcherrimum

Ptychomitriaceae 

 Campylostelium saxicola — rock-loving swan-necked moss
 Ptychomitrium gardneri
 Ptychomitrium incurvum

Pyrolaceae 

 Chimaphila maculata — spotted wintergreen
 Chimaphila menziesii — Menzies' wintergreen
 Chimaphila umbellata — common wintergreen
 Moneses uniflora — one-flower wintergreen
 Orthilia secunda — one-side wintergreen
 Pyrola americana — American wintergreen
 Pyrola asarifolia — pink wintergreen
 Pyrola chlorantha — greenflower wintergreen
 Pyrola elliptica — shinleaf
 Pyrola grandiflora — Arctic wintergreen
 Pyrola minor — lesser wintergreen
 Pyrola picta — whitevein wintergreen

Canada,family,P